(plural ; from the Samogitian  'stone' and  'pavement', itself from  'to rake, pull together') is a hidden underwater stony road or ford across swamps and swampy areas used for defense in the history of Lithuania.

Undetectable from the surface, these roads were usually known only to the locals, and as such were an important element of the defense against various invaders, including the Teutonic Knights in the 13–14th centuries. Kūlgrindas provided a safe shortcut between villages, hillforts, and other defensive structures. They were built by bringing stones, wood, or gravel over frozen swamps in the winter and letting them sink once the ice melted. Such procedure would be repeated several times. Sometimes wooden posts were inserted to protect the elevated area from washing away.

The remnants of kūlgrindas are most often found in the territory of Lithuania, but also in Kaliningrad Oblast (former East Prussia), Belarus, and Latvia. It is estimated that Lithuania has 27 kūlgrindas and 7 medgrindas, about half of them in Samogitia. The longest and best-known surviving kūlgrinda is across the Sietuva swamp between lakes Lūkštas and Paršežeris in Samogitia. It survives in three segments and was used up to the 19th century as a road between Kaltinėnai and Tverai. One of the first to investigate the Sietuva kūlgrinda was Ludwik Krzywicki. Other kūlgrindas are found in the Amalva swamp in southern Lithuania and at Šiuraičiai near Priekulė. The Alkupis kūlgrinda near Kvėdarna was severely damaged during land amelioration by Soviet authorities. The oldest medgrinda was found in Kernavė and is dated to the 4–7th centuries.

References

Roads in Lithuania
Archaeology of Lithuania
Types of roads